The Battle of Grenada took place on 6 July 1779 during the American Revolutionary War in the West Indies between the British Royal Navy and the French Navy, just off the coast of Grenada.  The British fleet of Admiral John Byron (the grandfather of Lord Byron) had sailed in an attempt to relieve Grenada, which the French forces of the Comte D'Estaing had just captured.

Incorrectly believing he had numerical superiority, Byron ordered a general chase to attack the French as they left their anchorage at Grenada.  Because of the disorganized attack and the French superiority, the British fleet was badly mauled in the encounter, although no ships were lost on either side.  Naval historian Alfred Thayer Mahan described the British loss as "the most disastrous ... that the British Navy had encountered since Beachy Head, in 1690."

Background

Following the entry of France into the American War of Independence as an American ally in early 1778, French Admiral the Comte D'Estaing arrived in the West Indies in early December 1778 in command of a fleet consisting of 12 ships of the line and a number of smaller vessels.  At about the same time, a British fleet under Admiral William Hotham also arrived, augmenting the fleet of Admiral Samuel Barrington.  The British then captured French-held St. Lucia, despite d'Estaing's attempt at relief.  The British used St. Lucia to monitor the major French base at Martinique, where d'Estaing was headquartered.

The British fleet was further reinforced in January 1779 by ten ships of the line under Admiral John Byron, who assumed command of the British Leeward Islands station.  Throughout the first half of 1779, both fleets received further reinforcements, after which the French fleet was slightly superior to that of the British.  Furthermore, Byron departed St. Lucia on 6 June in order to provide escort services to British merchant ships gathering at St. Kitts for a convoy to Europe, leaving d'Estaing free to act.  D'Estaing and Governor Bouillé seized the opportunity to begin a series of operations against nearby British possessions.

Their first target, the isle of Saint Vincent, fell on 18 June, and d'Estaing turned his attention to other islands.  He had hoped to capture the key British possession, Barbados, but after making no progress against the prevailing easterly trade winds, he turned his attention instead to Grenada.  The French fleet arrived off Grenada on 2 July, and stormed its main defences beginning late on 3 July.  Terms of capitulation were agreed on 4 July. On the way, the French squadron met the 50-gun Fier Rodrigue, under Chevalier de Montault, a letter of marque belonging to Beaumarchais and escorting a convoy. They commandeered Fier Rodrigue, and she took a place in the French line of battle.

Admiral Byron had been alerted to the French action at Saint Vincent, and was sailing with a force to recapture it.  When news arrived that the French were at Grenada, he immediately changed course to meet them.   The British fleet consisted of 21 ships of the line and 1 frigate.  Because he was escorting troop transports and was short of frigates, three ships of the line were assigned duty to escort the transports.  Admiral d'Estaing was warned on July 5 of Byron's approach, and promptly reembarked most of his troops.  His fleet consisted of 25 ships of the line and a large number of frigates and smaller vessels.  Admiral Byron was unaware of d'Estaing's full strength, since during his absence d'Estaing had been reinforced by a squadron from Europe under Lamotte-Picquet.

Battle

The French were anchored off St. George's Town on the southwest of the island, and the British approached during the night.  D'Estaing weighed anchor at 4:00 am when the British fleet was spotted, ordering his ships to form a line of battle in order of speed (that is, without regard to the usual sailing order), heading roughly northward.  This masked the true strength of the French fleet as each ship left the cluster at the anchorage.  Believing his force to be superior, Byron gave the order for general chase, approaching the anchorage from the northeast.

When Byron finally became aware of the full French strength, he attempted to reform a battle line.  As a result, the British attack was disordered and confused. ,  and two other ships got separated from the main body and were very badly mauled. Lion was forced to run downwind to Jamaica to avoid capture. The French lost no ships and eventually hauled off. The British lost 183 killed and 346 wounded. Fame had four killed and nine wounded. The French lost 190 killed and 759 wounded.

Aftermath
D'Estaing returned to Grenada to make repairs while Byron made for St. Kitts to do the same.  The French admiral failed to capitalise on his superior strength to launch further attacks in the West Indies.  Byron returned home in August. D'Estaing, after co-operating unsuccessfully with the Americans in an attack on Savannah in September also returned to Europe.

The action was a stepping stone into a career in the Navy for Ganteaume, then 22, who served as an auxiliary officer on Fier Rodrigue, who eventually rose to Vice Admiral.

Order of battle

French fleet

British fleet

Sources and references 
 Notes

Citations

Bibliography

External links
  Etat des forces navales françaises engagées dans la guerre d’indépendance des Etats-Unis

Conflicts in 1779
Grenada
Grenada 1779
Grenada 1779
History of British Grenada
1779 in France